John David Carver (born November 24, 1940) is an American country music artist. Between 1968 and 1977, he charted 15 Top 40 hits on the Billboard country chart. His highest-charting single was a cover of Tony Orlando's "Tie a Yellow Ribbon Round the Ole Oak Tree", a cover that reached No. 1 for him in 1974. He also had cover success with his version of the Starland Vocal Band's "Afternoon Delight." Carver lives today in rural Wilson County, Tennessee.

Biography

Early life
Carver was born and grew up in a rural area near Jackson, Mississippi, United States, and sang in a local country gospel quartet with his family. He went on to form his own band, the Capital Cowboys, which were sponsored by an ice-cream company. Carver embarked on his first national tour in 1959, playing at clubs and fairs, and moved to Los Angeles in 1965, where he made regular appearances on local television and led the house band at the Palomino Club, with such performers as Buck Owens, Johnny Cash, Patsy Cline, Linda Ronstadt, The Flying Burrito Brothers, Hoyt Axton, Willie Nelson, Merle Haggard, and Jerry Lee Lewis.

Rise to fame
Carver was discovered by Del Shannon, who got Carver a deal with Imperial Records. His debut single for Imperial, was "Think About Her All The Time" b / w "One Way Or The Other" (Imperial 66173) in mid-1966. Both sides were written, produced and arranged by Shannon, who was a longtime fan of country music.  Carver's composition "New Lips" was recorded by Roy Drusky in 1967. His self-titled debut album was released later that year, and contained the minor hit "Your Lily White Hands"; he had a few more modest successes with country pop offerings like 1968's "I Still Didn't Have the Sense to Go" and 1969's "That's Your Hang Up."

Later career
In 1972, he moved to ABC and had a major country hit with a version of Tony Orlando and Dawn's "Tie A Yellow Ribbon 'Round the Ole Oak Tree." A string of Top 40 country hits followed over the next five years, including the Top Tens "You Really Haven't Changed" (1973), "Don't Tell (That Sweet Old Lady of Mine)" (1974), and another country cover of a pop hit, the Starland Vocal Band's "Afternoon Delight" (1976). Carver's last Top 40 hit was 1977's "Living Next Door to Alice", and his final charting single was a 1981 cover of ABBA's "S.O.S." He subsequently became a regular performer in Branson, Missouri.

Discography

Albums

Singles

Awards
Johnny Carver has received positive critical response, and has been given several awards:
 The Arkansas Traveler Award
 The Country Music Association (CMA) "Broader Acceptance & Progress of Country Music" Award
 The State of Mississippi Executive Department Merit Award
 The Broadcast Music Citation of Achievement Award
 Four American Society of Composers, Authors, and Publishers (ASCAP) Merit Awards
 Mississippi's First Number One Country Artist
 Mississippi's Annual "Johnny Carver Day"—August 10

References

External links
[ Johnny Carver biography] at AllMusic
JohnnyCarver.com

1940 births
Living people
American country singer-songwriters
Country musicians from Mississippi
Musicians from Jackson, Mississippi
Singer-songwriters from Mississippi